The Chemin de fer de la Rivière Romaine  (in English, the Romaine River Railway) is a Canadian short line iron ore  mining railway operating in eastern Quebec.

Description
At Havre-Saint-Pierre, the mineral is loaded aboard bulk carriers and shipped upriver to the port of Sorel-Tracy. COGEMA operates a train ferry that connect with the line. QIT also operates passenger trains for workers, as the mine is not accessible by road.

The Romaine River Railway began operating in 1949 and is owned and operated by QIT-Fer et Titane, which is a subdivision of the Anglo-Australian company Rio Tinto Group.

References

External links 
QIT

Quebec railways
Iron ore railways
Mining railways
Mining in Quebec
Rio Tinto (corporation) subsidiaries